Changshu High School of Jiangsu Province, (or Shengshuzhong——for short) is a high school located in Changshu, Jiangsu, People's Republic of China.

History
The school was first founded in Sichuan in 1938. In 1946, it moved to Changshu and changed its name to Jiangsu Provincial High School of Changshu. And in 1953 it chose Changshu High School of Jiangsu Province as its name. In 1990, it was regarded as the first batch of qualified and key high schools by the Jiangsu Provincial Education Commission. In 2004, it was assessed as a four-star general high school of Jiangsu Province.

Mottoes
The school ethos is "Keep broad-minded and wise, learn practically".
The teaching style is "Keep strict, creative and devoted".()
The style of learning is "Study by yourself, supervise by yourself, help by yourself".

Organization
The school consists of the general Party branch and the Principal room.

General Party branch 
The general Party branch consists of:
Party branch
labor union
Youth league committee
student union.

Principal room
The Principal room is made up of
the offices
guidance department
filing room
office of moral education
teaching research office
general affairs department

Honors

Civilized Unit of Jiangsu Province
Model School of Jiangsu Province
Advanced Unit of moral education of Jiangsu Province
Advanced Unit of Scientific Research of Suzhou
Advanced Skeleton of Party of Suzhou

References

External links

High schools in Suzhou